A requinto guitar is a smaller version of a classical guitar, with a scale length between 52-54cm. It is tuned a fourth higher than a standard classical guitar, to A2-D3-G3-C4-E4-A4. They often, but not always, have a cutout to reach the higher frets.

Classical use

The requinto guitar is traditionally used in guitar orchestras, along with other sized guitars. The Requinto is also used in Ecuadorian culture, and their national songs like pasillos and boleros, where the requinto plays a very big role in improvisation. The playing style of the requinto is very similar, in all the songs, and it is rarely played differently.

.

Modern use

The requinto guitar is now especially popular in Mexico and elsewhere in Latin America. In Mexico it is used in Trío romántico groups.

Requintos made in Mexico have a deeper body than a standard classical guitar ( as opposed to ). Requintos made in Spain tend to be of the same depth as the standard classical.

See also
 
 Guitalele - A similar ukulele-guitar hybrid with the same tuning but a much smaller body.

References

Classical guitar